HD 96819 is a single star in the equatorial constellation of Hydra. It was formerly known by its designation 10 Crateris, but that name fell into disuse after constellations were redrawn and the star was no longer in Crater. It is visible to the naked eye as a dim, white-hued star with an apparent visual magnitude of 5.43. Parallax measurements put it at a distance of 182 light years away from the Sun. This is most likely (98.7% chance) a member of the TW Hydrae association.

This is a rapidly rotating A-type main-sequence star that is about double the mass of the Sun. It emits 20.66 times as much energy as the Sun, at an effective temperature of 8,954 K. HD 96819 is currently 31.5% through its life as a main-sequence star: after that it will swell up as a red giant. It is a young star of around nine million years age, and is a suspected variable star.

References

A-type main-sequence stars
TW Hydrae association
Hydra (constellation)
Durchmusterung objects
Crateris, 10
096819
054477
4334